The 1894 Minnesota gubernatorial election took place on November 6, 1894. Republican Party of Minnesota incumbent Knute Nelson easily defeated People's Party challenger Sidney M. Owen and Democratic Party of Minnesota candidate George Loomis Becker.

Results

See also
 List of Minnesota gubernatorial elections

External links
 http://www.sos.state.mn.us/home/index.asp?page=653
 http://www.sos.state.mn.us/home/index.asp?page=657

Minnesota
Gubernatorial
1894
November 1894 events